Gregory A. Hawkes (born October 22, 1952) is an American musician best known as the keyboardist and later bassist for the rock band The Cars.

Hawkes, a native of Fulton, Maryland, United States, attended Atholton High School where he played in a band called Teeth. He then attended Berklee College of Music for two years, majoring in composition and flute. He left to play in various bands, including Martin Mull and his Fabulous Furniture, where he played flute, saxophone, and clarinet. He also played in a band called Richard and the Rabbits, which included future Cars bandmates Ric Ocasek and Benjamin Orr.  He was the last member to join the Cars. Hawkes was also in the New Cars with original Cars member Elliot Easton, along with vocalist/guitarist Todd Rundgren, bassist Kasim Sulton, and drummer Prairie Prince. In 2018, Hawkes was inducted into the Rock and Roll Hall of Fame as a member of the Cars.

The Cars 
Hawkes's most notable involvement is with The Cars. Hawkes pushed the limits of available technology and sequencing helping to forge the sound of the 1980s. While The Cars were known commercially as a rock and new wave band, he had the biggest impact on the synth-pop and new wave sound of the Cars hits such as "Drive." His signature sounds include the Prophet-5 "sync" sound heard on "Let's Go" and "Hello Again" as well as arpeggiated and syncopated synth lines such as on "Shake it Up" and "Heartbeat City."

In 2010, Hawkes reunited with the surviving original members of The Cars to record their first album in 24 years, titled Move Like This, which was released on May 10, 2011.

Other
Hawkes also played with Ocasek as a solo artist, often playing both keyboards and bass guitar. He released a solo album, Niagara Falls, in 1983. He also plays guitar, bass, percussion instruments, saxophone, clarinet and ukulele. In 2008 he released a solo album of Beatles songs performed on the ukulele, The Beatles Uke.

Hawkes received a writing credit for "Service with a Smile" on Virginia-based progressive rock band Happy the Man's second album Crafty Hands in 1978.

In 1989, Chris Hughes asked Greg to come to England to record a new Paul McCartney song. He was featured on "Motor of Love" from the Flowers in the Dirt album, recorded at McCartney's own recording studio in a vintage windmill just south of London.

In 1995, Hawkes was a member of The Sky Dwellers, which also included Perry Geyer of Manufacture. 

In 2009, Hawkes contributed synth to several tracks on the album Invisible Embraces by Boston-based new wave band New Collisions.

Hawkes has also made at least two appearances in the children's television series Yo Gabba Gabba!, where he appears in segments instructing the viewer on playing certain instruments. In one of his appearances where he teaches the viewers on playing the ukulele, he performed the Cars' hit single You Might Think.

On May 8, 2014, Hawkes appeared onstage with Californian comedy rock/new wave band The Aquabats at Boston's Paradise Rock Club, where he joined the band in playing synthesizer for a cover of The Cars' "Just What I Needed".

In 2017, Hawkes toured with Todd Rundgren on his White Knights: The Chivalrock Tour, playing keyboards and saxophone. Hawkes also attended Rundgren's Toddstock event in 2018.

Current 
Hawkes lives in Lincoln, Massachusetts, where he works as a session musician. He was a member of the New Cars, a quasi-reformation of The Cars that also featured original guitarist Elliot Easton. Filling in for other original Cars members were singer/guitarist Todd Rundgren, Utopia bassist/vocalist Kasim Sulton and former Tubes drummer Prairie Prince. Atom Ellis filled in at bass when Kasim was touring with Meat Loaf. The band toured throughout 2006–2007. A live album with three new studio tracks, It's Alive!, was released in June 2006.

Before The Cars reunited in 2010, Hawkes played with The Turtles (starring Flo and Eddie) and Todd Rundgren.

Ukulele
Since 2001 Hawkes has been playing and experimenting with the ukulele, including renditions of The Cars songs "My Best Friend's Girl", "Drive", "Tonight She Comes" and "You Might Think".

In 2008, Hawkes released The Beatles Uke CD on Solid Air Records. The album consists of instrumental versions of 15 Beatles classics, in what he calls a “UKEsymphonic” style, using multi-tracked recordings to create a ukulele orchestra. The CD is a testimony to the influence that the Beatles, particularly McCartney, have had on Hawkes' music and career. Among other instruments, Hawkes owns and plays a Talsma custom ukulele.

Discography

Solo albums
 Niagara Falls (1983)
 The Beatles Uke (2008)

With the Cars
 The Cars (1978)
 Candy-O (1979)
 Panorama (1980)
 Shake It Up (1981)
 Heartbeat City (1984)
 Door to Door (1987)
 Move Like This (2011)

Solo singles
 "Jet Lag" (1983)
 "Backseat Waltz" (1983)

References

External links
 Greg Hawkes's Official Website (archived, incomplete; domain now defunct)
  Greg Hawkes 2 hour interview on RundgrenRadio.com
  Greg Hawkes performs Eleanor Rigby
 Greg Hawkes on the Keyboards Special on RundgrenRadio.com

American rock keyboardists
The Cars members
1952 births
Living people
People from Fulton, Maryland
American new wave musicians
American session musicians
The New Cars members
People from Lincoln, Massachusetts
Berklee College of Music alumni
Atholton High School alumni
21st-century American keyboardists
20th-century American keyboardists
Varèse Sarabande Records artists